Richard Holmes may refer to:

Entertainment
 Richard Holmes (biographer) (born 1946), British biographer
 Richard Holmes (organist) (1931–1991), American jazz organist known as Richard "Groove" Holmes
 Richard Holmes (actor) (born 1963), American actor
 Richard Holmes (producer) (born 1963), independent film producer
 Rick Holmes (disc jockey) (1936-2015), American jazz disc jockey

Sports
 Richard Holmes (cricketer) (born 1952), English cricketer
 Richard Holmes (Canadian football) (born 1952), former Canadian Football League running back
 Richard Holmes (footballer) (born 1980), former footballer for Notts County
 Richard G. Holmes (born 1947), former Paralympic athlete and psychologist.

Other
 Richard Holmes (Connecticut settler) (1633–1704), founding settler of Norwalk, Connecticut
 Richard Rivington Holmes (1835–1911), British archivist and courtier
 Richard Holmes (military historian) (1946–2011), British soldier and military historian
 Richard E. Holmes (born 1944), first black student to enroll at Mississippi State University
 Richard T. Holmes, American ornithologist
 Richard Winn Holmes (1923–1999), Associate Justice of the Kansas Supreme Court